Raphael Peixotto (September 1, 1837 – May 22, 1905) was a Jewish-American merchant from California.

Life 
Peixotto was born on September 1, 1837 in Willoughby, Ohio, the son of Dutch immigrant and physician Dr. Daniel L. M. Peixotto. His family was descended from Sephardic Jews expelled from Spain in 1492. His siblings included teacher Judith Salzedo Peixotto and diplomat Benjamin F. Peixotto.

Peixotto moved to San Francisco, California in around 1870 and became a merchant there. He was identified with a number of Jewish institutions in the city and served as president of Congregation Emanu-El.

In 1863, Peixotto married Myrtilla J. Davis in a ceremony performed by Isaac Leesser and Jacques J. Lyons. Their children were Edgar, Ernest, Sydney, Eustace, and Dr. Jessica.

Peixotto died on May 22, 1905.

References 

1837 births
1905 deaths
People from Willoughby, Ohio
19th-century American merchants
People from San Francisco
19th-century American Jews
20th-century American Sephardic Jews